HK01 is a Hong Kong-based online news portal launched by Yu Pun-hoi, a former chairman of the Ming Pao. It is operated by HK01 Company Limited, established in June 2015. The website went live on 11 January 2016. It publishes a weekly paper every Friday, the first edition of which was released on 11 March 2016. The company has a staff of approximately 700.

Circulation 
As of October 2021, there were 1.7 million unique visitors viewing on HK01's websites and mobile applications on a daily basis, which made it the most influential news media in Hong Kong. Its mobile application was the most downloaded news app in both Apple App Store and Google Play Store in Hong Kong for more than 45 months since March 2018.

Editorial opinion 
HK01 claims to be an "advocacy media." It claims to aim at a third path in the political fights between the pro-democracy and pro-establishment camps. Its founder Yu Pun-hoi is a pro-Beijing businessman, who write opinions for the 01 Opinion column, while the staff of the media are more inclined to the pro-democracy camp. According to a 2016 survey, most Hong Kong college students believed that HK01 was a neutral media. While it was criticised by the Hong Kong Free Press and VJMedia as a pro-Beijing media, its reporting was also described by pro-Beijing politician Ng Chau-pei to be anti-China.

Controversies

Coverage of Tiananmen Massacre anniversary
In 2017, HK01 was criticised by the Hong Kong Journalists Association (HKJA) for deleting an article covering release of new details of the Tiananmen Square massacre by the UK Government Archives shortly after the article's publication.  Pressure from founder Yu Pun-hoi was suspected to have motivated the removal. The article was later republished with a rebuttal, saying that mistakes had been made when verifying the information contained in the original version and denying there had been self-censorship.

Stance on Taiwan and Hong Kong independence
In 2018, HK01 was again criticised by the HKJA over its tagging an article it published about Taiwanese independence with an anti-independence disclaimer.  The company maintains a black-list containing pro-independence parties and groups in Hong Kong whose events it will not attend, with whom it will not form partnerships, and from whom it will accept advertising.

See also
 Media in Hong Kong
 List of newspapers in Hong Kong

References

External links
 
Todaynews Website 

Hong Kong news websites
Publications established in 2016
2016 establishments in Hong Kong
Chinese-language newspapers published in Hong Kong